New Odanah is a census-designated place in the town of Sanborn, Ashland County, Wisconsin, United States. Its population was 466 as of the 2020 census. New Odanah is located on the Bad River Indian Reservation. In local parlance, New Odanah is considered part of Odanah, which is the only name that appears on Wisconsin DOT state and county maps.

See also
 Odanah, Wisconsin

References

Census-designated places in Ashland County, Wisconsin
Census-designated places in Wisconsin